Hello, Love You, Goodbye is an album by the New Zealand band The Exponents, released in December 1999. The first six tracks were new studio recordings, while the final six were live recordings of some of The Exponents' hits, recorded at the Pounamu Hotel, in Takapuna in Auckland. The album was made available digitally in May 2013.

Track listing
"Cathode Ray"
"Loneliness... Is What It Is"
"Red, White and Crimson"
"Haunting"
"Big World Out Your Window"
"Hello, Love You, Goodbye"
"Erotic" (live)
"Sink Like a Stone" (live)
"Whatever Happened To Tracey?" (live)
"La La Lulu" (live)
"Victoria" (live)
"Who Loves Who The Most" (live)
"Why Does Love Do This To Me?" (live)
"I'll Say Goodbye (Even Though I'm Blue)" (live)

Charts

References 

The Exponents albums
1999 albums